Bolat Karishaluly Asanov (born 7 May 1961) is a Kazakh chess grandmaster.

References 

Living people
Chess grandmasters
1961 births
Place of birth missing (living people)